Sigma Sport is a German manufacturer of electronic sports equipment.

Products
Rox and Topline product lines of heart rate monitors, altimeters, and bike computers.

See also 
 Polar Electro
 Garmin Forerunner

Watch brands
Neustadt an der Weinstraße